The Battle of Arras (also known as the First Battle of Arras,  was an attempt by the French Army to outflank the German Army, which was attempting to do the same thing during the "Race to the Sea", the reciprocal attempts by both sides, to exploit conditions created during the First Battle of the Aisne. At the First Battle of Picardy  each side had attacked expecting to advance round an open northern flank and found instead that troops had arrived from further south and extended the flank northwards.

The Tenth Army, led by General Louis Maud'huy, attacked advancing German forces on 1 October and reached Douai, where the 6th Army under Crown Prince Rupprecht counter-attacked, as three corps of the German 1st, 2nd and 7th armies attacked further south. The French were forced to withdraw towards Arras and Lens was occupied by German forces on 4 October. Attempts to encircle Arras from the north were defeated and both sides used reinforcements to try another flanking move further north at the Battle of La Bassée  The reciprocal flanking moves ended in Flanders, when both sides reached the North Sea coast and then attempted breakthrough attacks during the First Battle of Flanders.

Background

Strategic developments
On 28 September, Falkenhayn ordered that all available troops were to be transferred to the 6th Army, for an offensive on the existing northern flank by the IV, Guard and I Bavarian corps near Arras, an offensive by the II Cavalry Corps on the right flank of the 6th Army, across Flanders to the coast and an acceleration of the operations at the Siege of Antwerp, before it could be reinforced. Rupprecht intended to halt the advance of the French on the west side of Arras and conduct an enveloping attack around the north of the city.

Prelude

Battle of Albert, 25–29 September

On 21 September Falkenhayn had decided to concentrate the 6th Army near Amiens, to attack westwards to the coast and then envelop the French northern flank south of the Somme. The offensive by the French Second Army forced Falkenhayn to divert the XXI Corps and I Bavarian Corps as soon as they arrived to extend the front northwards from Chaulnes to Péronne on 24 September and drive the French back over the Somme. On 26 September, the Second Army dug in on a line from Lassigny to Roye and Bray-sur-Somme and German cavalry moved north, to enable the II Bavarian Corps to occupy the ground north of the Somme. On 27 September, the German cavalry (Georg von der Marwitz), drove back the 61st and 62nd Reserve divisions of General Joseph Brugère, who had replaced General Albert d'Amade, to clear the front for the XIV Reserve Corps to link with the right flank of the II Bavarian Corps.

The II Bavarian and XIV Reserve corps, pushed back a French Territorial division from Bapaume and advanced towards Bray-sur-Somme and Albert. From  the French XXI and X corps north of the Somme, with support on the right flank by the 81st, 82nd, 84th and 88th Territorial divisions (Brugère) and the 1st, 3rd, 5th and 10th Cavalry divisions of the Cavalry Corps (General Conneau) to the south-east of Arras, defended the approaches to Albert. On 28 September, the French were able to stop the German advance, on a line from Maricourt to Fricourt and Thiepval. The German cavalry was stopped near Arras by the French cavalry.

Battle

30 September – 1 October 

A French division arrived at Arras on 30 September and repulsed a German attack at the Cojeul river and high ground near Monchy-le-Preux on 1 October. The French were then slowly pushed back from Guémappe, Wancourt and Monchy-le-Preux, until the arrival of X Corps. Joffre ordered Castelnau to cease attempts to outflank the Germans opposite and operate defensively. From the northern corps of the Second Army and the Territorial and cavalry divisions nearby, Joffre created a  under the command of General Maud'huy. The  advanced on Arras, with the gap south to the Second Army, held by the Territorial divisions.

The westward advance of the XIV Reserve Corps, from Bapaume to Albert and Amiens, was stopped by French troops east of Albert. Five German cavalry divisions further north, were also confronted by French cavalry and infantry, while attempting to guard the XIV Reserve Corps flank. French reinforcements increased the possibility of a reciprocal French outflanking manoeuvre. Agents reported the massing of French and British troops, between Arras and Lille and that the railways between Lille, Douai and Arras had been protected by an outpost line, from Orchies to Douai and Arras. The 1st Guard Division and IV Corps were moved to the northern flank of the XIV Reserve Corps, to allow some of the cavalry divisions to redeploy. The I Bavarian Reserve Corps (General Karl von Fasbender), was withdrawn from Lorraine and moved to Cambrai and Valenciennes, intended to advance from Douai, in another attempt to outflank the French. The corps began to reach Artois on 30 September and before noon, was ordered to advance with all of the units which had arrived, to reach Douai before dark. Five battalions of the 1st Bavarian Reserve Division advanced north-west from Cambrai and parts of the 5th Bavarian Reserve Division left Denain heading westwards, also for Douai.

The 5th Bavarian Reserve Division advance was stopped by French troops at Lewarde,  short of Douai, until the village was captured in the evening, after which the division stopped for the night. The 1st Bavarian Reserve Division battalions also came within  of Douai, after overcoming French troops at Cantin and Raucourt. Behind the advanced battalions, the rest of the corps arrived during the day. Both divisions were ordered to capture the town next day and occupy high ground to the west. The inner units were to pin down French troops in Douai, as the flanking units encircled the town and met at Esquerchin to the north-west. The envelopment failed, due to the distance to be travelled and the resistance of French skirmishers, which delayed the German advance. Douai was captured by nightfall and  prisoners were collected by 2 October, mainly from Territorial regiments.

2 October 

The advance resumed on 2 October, with the 1st Bavarian Reserve Division in the south, attacking through Brebières to St Laurent and the 5th Bavarian Reserve Division to advance via Izel and Oppy to Bailleul-Sir-Berthoult. It was known that the French 70th Reserve Division was moving south-east, also towards Bailleul and Lens. The French advanced with a left flank guard facing Douai, to link with the 77th Division at Gavrelle and Fresnes. The French divisions had been rushed from the Vosges and were also deployed at short notice. A brigade of the 70th Reserve Division moved towards Fresnes and one advanced south-west to Gavrelle, ready to pause on 2 October and then push outposts southwards. The French moved south in parallel brigade columns, as the Germans moved west in divisional columns. 

Bavarian Reserve Infantry Brigade 9 of the 5th Bavarian Reserve Division, reached Esquerchin and set flank guards facing north, before advancing on Quiéry la Motte, when French artillery near Izel pinned down the German infantry and destroyed a German artillery battery. French infantry then attacked from Drocourt and forced the German columns to deploy and work forward closer to Izel, to try to overrun the artillery. Bavarian Reserve Infantry Brigade 11 advanced on Beaumont, Drocourt and Bois-Bernard, moving the rearguard round to the right flank, which arrived just in time to meet a French attack from Hénin Liétard. Both German brigades attacked again and captured Izel, the heights east of Bois-Bernard and Beaumont Station. Later in the evening Drocourt and Fresnoy were captured and Bois-Bernard was entered, being captured by dawn on 3 October.

3 October 
By the morning of 3 October, the German front line ran from Drocourt to Bois-Bernard and Fresnoy. To the south-east, Bavarian Reserve Infantry Brigade 9 attack on Neuvireul was repulsed by small-arms and heavy artillery-fire from Acheville. The brigade dug in between Izel and Neuvireul. In the 1st Bavarian Reserve Division area to the south, the advance was at first protected on both flanks and advanced to Fresnes unopposed. The advance on Arras continued, supported by artillery moved forward during the night and the Guard, 4th, 7th and 9th Cavalry divisions in the Scarpe valley. The cavalry was to cover a westwards move of the Bavarian divisions, the 5th towards Vimy and Thélus and the 1st to Thélus and St Laurent. The cavalry were slow to move and the Bavarian infantry were held up by attacks from the north, until the cavalry arrived during the afternoon. Bavarian Reserve Infantry Brigade 9 managed to capture Méricourt after the 9th Cavalry Division arrived, which enabled the rest of the 5th Bavarian Reserve Division to advance and capture Rouvroy and Acheville. Around  French patrols slowed the advance and the 5th Bavarian Reserve Division put flank guards out on the right for the advance on Gavrelle. French troops in Oppy engaged the Germans with small-arms and artillery-fire, which delayed the Germans until the success of a costly attack against Oppy and Neuvireuil.

Costly German attacks were made on Beaurains, Mercatel and the Arras suburbs of St Laurent-Blangy and St Nicolas, which were repulsed and forced the Germans to move northwards. An evening attack by three battalions on Arleux failed, which left the French position from Arleux to Bailleul and Point de Jour intact. More orders arrived to press the advance and an improvised , took over flank protection to the north and responsibility for the advance from Méricourt to Avion;  was ordered to capture Vimy. The flank attack by the French 70th Reserve Division had been repulsed but the advance reached only Drocourt and Gavrelle instead of St Laurent and Bailleul. The disorganisation in the 5th Bavarian Reserve Division, which had been caused by the urbanised landscape and the vigour of the French defence, was not remedied by the  groups and worsened on 4 October.

4 October 
On 4 October, Joffre made the  independent as the Tenth Army and told Castelnau to keep the Second Army in position, relying on the increasing number of French troops arriving further north to divert German pressure. A  gap separated the two 5th Bavarian Reserve Division objectives and a battalion sent to capture Avion disappeared in the dark. One battalion reached the Lens–Arras road but then managed to advance only another  before dark. A cavalry regiment had moved forward independently to high ground west of Angres by  calling out to civilians that they were British cavalry. German troops entered Lens, which had been held by a group of French cyclists and a dismounted brigade of the 5th Cavalry Division.

The progress of  assisted  further south, to capture Acheville before daybreak, despite a determined French defence and then press on beyond two more defence lines was limited. The advance was stopped  short of the railway embankment east of Vimy. New orders arrived for the troops to press on, as it was mistakenly believed that the French were withdrawing but the German infantry made no attempt to advance in daylight, over open ground and without artillery support. The advance continued up the ridge south of Vimy but missed La Folie (Hill 140) in the dark and ended up on  but French troops had already retired from Vimy and the hill.

As the units further north advanced,  was able to advance through Farbus and reach  around midnight. The 1st Bavarian Reserve Division had hardly moved all its attacks on Bailleul having failed, causing a gap to appear between the divisions. It was hoped that German cavalry divisions would be able to advance on 5 October and that the 7th Cavalry Division would manage to turn the French northern flank. An advance in the north was ordered on Notre Dame de Lorette (Hill 165), which took the chapel unopposed at  The rest of  concentrated between Angres, Souchez and Givenchy (the French artillery bombardment of the Lorette Spur, lasted into 1915).

Aftermath

Analysis

The French had been able to use the undamaged railways behind their front to move troops more quickly than the Germans, who had to take long detours, wait for repairs to damaged tracks and replace rolling stock. The French used Belgian and captured German rail wagons and the domestic telephone and telegraph systems. The initiative held by the Germans in August was not recovered as all troop movements to the right flank were piecemeal.

Until the end of the Siege of Maubeuge  only the single line from Trier to Liège, Brussels, Valenciennes and Cambrai was available and had to be used to supply the German armies on the right, as the 6th Army travelled in the opposite direction, limiting the army to forty trains a day, which took four days to move a corps. Information on German troop movements from wireless interception enabled the French to forestall German moves but the Germans had to rely on reports from spies, which were frequently wrong. The French resorted to more cautious infantry tactics, using cover to reduce casualties and a centralised system of control, as the German army commanders followed contradictory plans. The French did not need quickly to obtain a decisive result and could concentrate on preserving the French army.

Local operations

5–6 October

Foch arrived on 5 October, in command of all French forces north of the Oise and ordered the Tenth Army to end the fighting withdrawal and regain the initiative. Hasty counter-attacks were made from the area of La Folie, which quickly bogged down and soon after, parties of French troops were seen retreating from Vimy Ridge, through Neuville-Saint-Vaast (Neuville) and south of Carency. The Bavarians were ordered to pursue the French,  to a line from Souchez to Carency and Camblain, while  advanced through Neuville-Saint-Vaast and St Eloi to Acq. At  Zouaves made a costly counter-attack north of Thélus and when the Bavarians attempted to advance they were engaged from the village. Eventually, the capture of Thélus enabled Neuville to be occupied unopposed but a new French defensive position was found at La Targette.

The 1st Bavarian Reserve Division managed to capture Bailleul, which brought both divisions level late on 5 October, ready for a broader-front advance in the morning.  was ordered to attack towards Camblain again, protected on the northern flank by cavalry. The Lorette Spur was a dominating position, which gave an occupant observation over much of the locality but the steep, wooded slopes gave cover to an attacker and artillery was difficult to bring to bear. The French could also fire on the spur from three sides. Should the Bavarians withdraw, the area of Ablain, Carency and Souchez would become untenable and a retirement was rejected. A further advance was not possible, because the cavalry had not arrived by 6 October and the 1st Bavarian Reserve Division was still further back around Bailleul and Point de Jour.

The 7th and 9th Cavalry divisions operating north of the Lorette Spur managed to hold on against probing attacks and bombardments from the north, south-west and south. The attack towards Arras faltered against increasing French resistance, a flank guard at Ablain having been attacked all day from the north-west and south-west. Troops were taken from Souchez and the Lorette Spur to cover the gap from Carency to La Targette until dark. On 6 October,  attacked St Eloi through La Targette, which the French had abandoned but after  was forced under cover by French troops near Berthonval Farm, until heavy howitzers near La Folie managed to hit the St Eloi church tower and positions around the farm. The Bavarians were redirected southwards towards Écurie and were then stopped near La Targette for the rest of the day, by French troops well dug in at Maison Blanche. At  a rumour that German troops were in Arras, led to orders to attack again and a cancellation two hours later. In the 1st Bavarian Reserve Division area, the troops west of Bailleul and Thélus attacked Roclincourt at  but were slowed on open ground by French artillery fire and two days without food and water. The 1st Division commander ordered that the attack must continue, to keep up with the 5th Division but by night the division was still  short of Roclincourt and dispersed over a wide area, which the French exploited to get behind parties of troops and inflict many casualties.

7–9 October
Ambitious orders were issued for 7 October, to advance north of Arras to Petit Servin, Mont St Eloi and Marœuil, supported by attacks from the east by the 1st Bavarian Reserve Division, IV Corps from the south-east and the Guard Corps from the south. The arrival of the XIV Corps to the north ended the chronic problem of flank security but to the south exhaustion and the need to close gaps and resist French counter-attacks from reinforcements which arrived during the day.  in the north managed to repulse French attacks but could not advance and was severely bombarded on the Lorette Spur, which forced some temporary retirements towards Carency.  failed to get forward to St Eloi and no advance was possible towards Roclincourt, after the French Tenth Army had issued orders to X Corps and the 77th Division to hold their positions at all costs.

Despite elaborate arrangements, only a small amount of ground along the Bailleul–Arras road was taken and the attack on Roclincourt was abandoned as a costly failure, one battalion being reduced to  Attacks on the Lorette Spur towards Petit Severin failed and attacks by the 13th Division of XIV Corps in the north made no progress. During the afternoon the French made a general attack from Ablain to Neuville which forced the Germans and Bavarians to rush forward every spare man to plug gaps between units. At Carency the French 43rd Division took the west end and was then stopped by reinforcements rushed from Vimy who stabilised the front and took prisoner  of the 31st Chasseurs. The 13th Division reached the Lorette Spur and dug in, which by nightfall meant that the German positions ran from Aix-Noulette to the spur, Bois de Bouvigny, west of Ablain, Carency, La Targette, Maison Blanche, Neuville, north of Écurie, east of Roclincourt and south to the Scarpe valley. These positions marked the end of the battle of manoeuvre in the area, local attempts to advance were defeated by the French and by 9 October, German reliefs in line were under way, to reorganise the mixture of units, which took a week.

Subsequent operations

First Battle of Flanders

To the north, the I and II Cavalry corps attacked between Lens and Lille and were quickly repulsed and forced back behind the Lorette Spur. Next day the cavalry was attacked by the first troops of the French XXI Corps advancing from Béthune. On 8 October the German XIV Corps arrived from Mons and took over from the cavalry, which were sent north to resume their attack from La Bassée and Armentières. The IV Cavalry Corps had moved north of Lille and on 8 October reached Ypres and then turned south-west towards Hazebrouck, where they were met by the new French I Cavalry Corps (General Antoine de Mitry) and forced to retire to Bailleul. By 9 October, the defensive lines established on the Aisne in September had been extended to the west and north to within  of Dunkirk and the North Sea coast. On 3 October, Joffre formed the Tenth Army under General de Maud'huy to reinforce his left and prevent its envelopment. The XXI Corps arrived from Champagne and the 13th Division assembled west of Lille.

Lille 1914

During the Battle of Charleroi (21 August), General d'Amade garrisoned the area from Maubeuge to Dunkirk with a line of Territorial divisions. The 82nd Division held the area between the Escaut and the Scarpe, with advanced posts at Lille, Deûlémont and Tournai, just over the Belgian border. The Territorials dug in but on 23 August, the British Expeditionary Force (BEF) retreated from Mons and the Germans drove the 82nd Territorial Division out of Tournai. The German advance reached Roubaix and Tourcoing before a counter-attack by the 83rd and 84th regiments reoccupied Tournai during the night. Early on 24 August, the 170th Brigade organised the defence of the bridges over the Escaut but around noon, the Territorials were forced back by a German attack. The Mayor of Lille requested that the city be declared open and at  the Minister of War ordered the garrison to leave the city and move between La Bassée and Aire-sur-la-Lys.

On 25 August, the German 1st Army reached the outskirts of Lille and General Herment withdrew the garrison. On 2 September, German detachments entered Lille and left three days later, the town was intermittently occupied by patrols, guarding the right flank of the 1st Army. After the German retreat from the Marne and the First Battle of the Aisne  the northward manoeuvre known as the Race for the Sea commenced and on 3 October, Joffre formed the 10th Army under General de Maud'huy, to reinforce the northern flank of the French armies. The 13th Division of XXI Corps arrived from Champagne and detrained to the west of Lille. On the morning of 4 October, Chasseur battalions of the 13th Division moved to positions north and east of Lille.

The 4th Chasseur Battalion advanced towards the suburb of Fives but encountered by small-arms fire as it left the Lille ramparts. The chasseurs drove the Germans back from the railway station and fortifications, taking several prisoners and some machine-guns. North of the town, the French met more German patrols near Wambrechies and Marquette and the 7th Cavalry Division skirmished in the neighbourhood of Fouquet. The new Lille garrison, consisting of Territorial and Algerian mounted troops, took post to the south at Faches and Wattignies, linking with the rest of the 13th Division at Ronchin. A German attack reached the railway and on 5 October, a French counter-attack recaptured Fives, Hellemmes, Flers, the fort of Mons-en-Barœul and Ronchin; to the west, cavalry engagements took place along the Ypres Canal. On 6 October, the 13th Division left two chasseur battalions at Lille as XXI Corps moved south towards Artois and French cavalry near Deûlémont repulsed a German attack. On 7 October, the chasseur battalions were withdrawn and the defence of Lille reverted to the Territorial and Algerian troops. From  the I Cavalry Corps engaged German troops between Aire-sur-la-Lys and Armentieres but failed to re-open the road to Lille.

At  on 9 October, a German aeroplane appeared over Lille and dropped two bombs on the General Post Office. In the afternoon, all men from  ordered to the Béthune Gate, with instructions to leave Lille immediately. Civilians from Lille, Tourcoing, Roubaix and neighbouring villages, left on foot for Dunkirk and Gravelines. Several died on the way of exhaustion and others were taken prisoners by German Uhlans. The last train left Lille at dawn on 10 October, an hour after German artillery had begun to fire on the neighbourhood of the station, Prefecture and the Palais des Beaux Arts. At  on 11 October, after a lull since the previous afternoon, the bombardment resumed until  and then continued intermittently. On 12 October, the garrison capitulated, by when  had been killed, many fires had been started and the vicinity of the railway station was destroyed. Five companies of Bavarian troops entered the town, followed throughout the day by cavalry, artillery and more infantry.

First Battle of Artois

After studying the possibilities for an offensive the Operations Bureau of the French army recommended to Joffre a dual offensive, with attacks in Artois and Champagne, to crush the German salient in France. Despite shortages of equipment, artillery and ammunition, which led Joffre to doubt that a decisive success could be obtained, it was impossible to allow the Germans to concentrate their forces in Russia. Principal attacks were to be made in Artois by the Tenth Army towards Cambrai and by the Fourth Army in Champagne, with supporting attacks elsewhere. The objectives were to deny the Germans an opportunity to move troops and to break through in several places, to force the Germans to retreat. The Tenth Army was to capture Vimy Ridge, to dominate the Douai plain and induce a German retirement. Artillery support for the offensive would consist of  including  by 25 December.

Foch ordered Maud'Huy to slow the planned pace of the offensive, of successive attacks on several days, to ensure artillery support for the infantry, which was intended to substitute shells for lives. The offensive was fought from  but despite the careful preparations achieved little. Artillery support was insufficient and rains turned the battlefield into a morass. The XXXIII Corps attack began next day and was equally frustrated by the German defence. Next day the corps concentrated its attack on Carency to little effect until 27 December, when  of front-line trench was captured, only for most to be lost to a German counter-attack. Bad weather then delayed the offensive and on 5 January, Joffre decided to reinforce the Fourth Army, where the First Battle of Champagne, had been more successful, with troops from the Tenth Army, the offensive in Artois being officially ended on 13 January.

Notes

Footnotes

References

Books
 
 
 
 
 
 
 
 
 
 
 

Websites

Further reading
Books
 
 
 
 

Encyclopaedias

External links

 Battle of Arras 1914

Arras 1
Arras 1
Arras 1
Arras 1
1914 in France
Arras
Arras
October 1914 events
France–Germany military relations